Saar Netanel (born c.1972) was a Jerusalem city council member and was one of the owners of Jerusalem’s only hat pub (The Shushan Pub) at the time it closed in 2007.  He was the first openly gay man elected to an Israeli city council.  Netanel was chairman of the Jerusalem Meretz branch.

A riot broke out at Wigstock “98 (an annual AIDS fundraiser and drag festival) and four were arrested. Netanel, who was chair of Hebrew University of Jerusalem’s GLBT student union, Ha'Asiron Ha'Acher, was one of the people arrested.

Publications
Why the Eurovision belongs in Tel Aviv

References

External links
Gay vs. Orthodox: A Deadly Turn in Israel's Culture War?

City councillors of Jerusalem
Israeli LGBT politicians
Israeli LGBT rights activists
Israeli gay men
Meretz politicians
Hebrew University of Jerusalem alumni
Drinking establishment owners
Year of birth uncertain
Living people
Place of birth missing (living people)